Camané (born Carlos Manuel Moutinho Paiva dos Santos Duarte, 20 December 1966 in Oeiras) is a male vocalist and a forerunner of the new generation of fado male singers. "The greatest fadista since Amália Rodrigues and Maria da Fé," is how British biographer David Bret, describes him.

He started gaining recognition in Portugal in 1979 after winning the 'Grande Noite do Fado' (Great Fado Night). After this first step, he continued to consistently work toward commercial success with critically well-received albums and a concert tour that touched upon both large and small venues, including 'Casas de Fado' (fado clubs) in Lisbon. He toured outside Portugal to sold-out audiences throughout his European tour.

He has released six million-selling albums: Uma Noite de Fados (1995), Na Linha da Vida (1998) marking the beginning of three records produced by José Mário Branco, Esta Coisa da Alma (2000), Pelo Dia Dentro (2001), Como sempre... Como dantes (live in 2003), and Sempre De Mim (2008). These have been released in several European and Asian countries.
He has been distinguished with several awards for his voice and talent.

Camané has been formerly married to another great fadista, Aldina Duarte. Camané (and his short height) is frequently mentioned by the fictional fadista Rouxinol Faduncho, in Blablabla do Artista (the intro for his second CD) and in Cais do Sodré.

Discography

Albums
Uma Noite de Fados (1995)
Na Linha da Vida (1998)
Esta Coisa da Alma (2000)
Pelo Dia Dentro (2001)
Como sempre... Como dantes (live) (2003)
DVD – Ao vivo no São Luíz (2006)
Sempre de Mim (Edição Especial Limitada CD+DVD) (2008)
Do Amor e dos Dias (2010)
O Melhor 1995–2013 (Compilation, Double CD) (2013)
Infinito Presente (2015)
Canta Marceneiro (2017)

Collaborations
Camané & Mário Laginha - Aqui Está-Se Sossegado (2019)

References

External links 
 

Portuguese fado singers
20th-century Portuguese male singers
Living people
Golden Globes (Portugal) winners
People from Oeiras, Portugal
1966 births
21st-century Portuguese male singers